Sitae Alhven Dam (in Arabic: سد وسيطاء الحفن ) is a gravity dam in southern Saudi Arabia.

Dams in Saudi Arabia
Gravity dams